The modern division of philosophy into theoretical philosophy and practical philosophy has its origin in Aristotle's categories of natural philosophy and moral philosophy. The one has theory for its object, and the other practice.
__forcetoc__

Overview
In Sweden and Finland courses in theoretical and practical philosophy are taught separately, and are separate degrees. Other countries may use a similar scheme—some Scottish universities, for example, divide philosophy into logic, metaphysics, and ethics—but in most universities around the world philosophy is taught as a single subject. There is also a unified philosophy subject in some Swedish universities, such as Södertörns Högskola.

Subjects of practical philosophy
Examples of practical philosophy subjects are:
Ethics
Aesthetics
Decision theory
Political philosophy

Philosophical counseling

Practical philosophy is also the use of philosophy and philosophical techniques in everyday life. This can take a number of forms including reflective practice, personal philosophical thinking, and philosophical counseling.

Examples of philosophical counseling subjects include:
Philosophical counseling
Philosophy of education
Philosophy of law
Philosophy of religion
Philosophy of history
Philosophy of social science
Value theory
Reflective practice

References